The 2013 American Le Mans Series was the fifteenth and final season of the International Motor Sports Association GT Championship being labeled as the American Le Mans Series, before merging up with the Grand-Am Rolex Sports Car Series in 2014. 

As the IMSA and Grand-Am merger was announced on September 5, 2012, between NASCAR Holdings (Grand-Am's owner) and Panoz Motorsports, the 2013 season was the transition season as both series were now held under the NASCAR Holdings banner. As such, this is the 43rd season of the series dating back to the 1971 IMSA GT Championship.

It began on March 16 with the 61st running of the 12 Hours of Sebring and ended with the 16th running of the Petit Le Mans on October 19. At the seventh round in Baltimore, Muscle Milk Pickett Racing successfully defended their 2012 Prototype One championship.

Calendar
The calendar was announced October 18, 2012. The race at the Circuit of the Americas near Austin, Texas, was previously announced in June 2012, and a combined event with the Rolex Sports Car Series at Road America was announced on September 28, 2012. The event at Mid-Ohio, a joint weekend with the IndyCar Series, was not renewed. The event at Mazda Raceway Laguna Seca was initially scheduled on May 18. However, with this date conflicting with the 24 Hours Nürburgring, the series opted to move the event up one week to May 11. The event was also shortened from 6 hours to 4 hours.

Entry list

Team announcements
 On September 17, 2012, it was announced that the DeltaWing prototype had been cleared for entry into the ALMS for 2013.
 On October 26, 2012, Porsche announced that it would cease development of the 911 GT3-RSR (Type 997), which had competed in the series since 2005, to focus its efforts on developing its next generation 911 GT3-RSR (Type 991) race car set to debut in 2014. As a result, the development partnership with Flying Lizard Motorsports was discontinued. Porsche will, however, continue to provide support for customer teams continuing to compete with the 911 GT3-RSR (Type 997).
 On November 15, 2012, Flying Lizard Motorsports announced that they would transition to competing in the GT Challenge category. On that date they confirmed a full-season campaign for their #44 Porsche 911 GT3 Cup entry to be piloted by team principal Seth Neiman and 2-time 24 Hours of Daytona GT class champion Spencer Pumpelly.
 On December 2, 2012, BMW announced that they would stop racing with the M3 GT2 in favour of the BMW Z4 GTE model.
 On December 5, 2012, Rebellion Racing announced that they would contest the full season with a single Lola B12/60 Toyota P1 Prototype. The team will also enter a second car for at least the 12 Hours of Sebring.
 On December 6, 2012, CORE Autosport confirmed their return to the PC category with drivers Colin Braun and Jon Bennett piloting their No. 05 entry. Braun and Bennett will be joined by Mark Wilkins for the 12 Hours of Sebring and Petit Le Mans. The driver lineup for the team's second entry (No. 06) is still pending.
 On December 19, 2012 Paul Miller Racing announced that Porsche works driver, Marco Holzer, would join Bryce Miller in competing for the GT championship in the team's 911 GT3-RSR (Type 997). The team also announced the switch to Michelin tires, having previously competed on Dunlop tires.
 On January 18, 2013, Risi Competizione announced their return to the GT class. They will field one Ferrari 458 Italia, with drivers yet to be announced.
 On January 22, 2013, CORE Autosport announced that it would field a Porsche 997 GT3-RSR in GT, in addition to their PC effort. Patrick Long and Tom Kimber-Smith will drive it.
 Extreme Speed Motorsports will switch to P2 fielding two HPD ARX-03b prototypes, retaining drivers Scott Sharp and Johannes van Overbeek in the No. 01 and Ed Brown and Guy Cosmo in the No. 02.

Results and standings
Overall winners in bold.

Championships
Points were awarded to the top ten cars and drivers which complete at least 70% of their class winner's distance. Teams with multiple entries only score the points of their highest finishing entry in each race. Drivers were required to drive a minimum of 45 minutes to earn points, except for the Long Beach event which required only 30 minutes. Drivers are required to complete a particular amount of the minimum number of laps in order to earn points. The number of laps vary depending on the course size.

Team championships
Teams with full season entries are awarded points in the team championships.  Teams which participated in a partial season or on a race-by-race basis are not included in these championships.

P1 standings

P2 standings

1: Car was scored in 1st place in the race results, but was subsequently penalized for a late-race avoidable contact incident, resulting in the team being awarded points and winnings as the 3rd-place finisher. The points and earnings for the 2nd and 3rd place cars were elevated to 1st and 2nd, respectively.

PC standings
All teams utilize the Oreca FLM09 chassis with Chevrolet LS3 engine.

GT standings

GTC standings
All teams utilize variations of the Porsche 997 GT3 Cup.

Driver championships
Drivers who participated in races but failed to score points over the course of the season are not listed.

P1 standings

P2 standings

PC standings
Drivers in the PC category are allowed to drive for more than one car during an event.  If a driver is in each car for a minimum of two hours each, he is allowed to score the points from whichever car he chooses.

GT standings

GTC standings

References

American Le Mans Series seasons
American Le Mans Series
American Le Mans Series